Carlo Tuzii was an Italian director, writer and producer, best known for films such as La Gabbia and Ciao Gulliver.

Career 
He began his career with Rai, after winning a competition in 1956. In 1966 he left Rai and started Pont Royal Film TV. His first film was Ciao Gulliver with Lucia Bosè, Sydne Rome, Enrico Maria Salerno and Antonello Campodifiori. In 1967 the documentary Amen won the Venice film festival.In 1972 he directed Tutte le domeniche mattina the only movie interpreted by Sergio Endrigo.

He was one of the first music video creators: He made videos for Pooh, Raffaella Carrà, Gianni Togni, Umberto Tozzi and others. He changed his career as producer for Edith Brook's il ragazzo con il violoncello  and Faliero Rosati's Il momento dell'avventura" and "La Gabbia" with Miguel Bosè and from 1977 a collaboration with Vittorio Gassman with whom he made Gassman all'asta and Affabulazione by Pier paolo Pasolini. In 1986 he produced Francesco Maselli's Storia d'amore introducing Valeria Golino at the Venice film festival. The film won the jury special prize. The following year brought Barbablù barbablù directed by Fabio Carpi  with as main actor Sir John Gielgud and an international cast .

Filmography 
 1989 - Marco e Laura dieci anni fa
 1988 - L'altro enigma
 1987 - Barbablù, Barbablù
 1986 - Love Story
 1983 - Dieci registi italiani, dieci racconti italiani
 1981 - " Questo incerto sentimento"di J.B Priestley
 1980 - Venezia ultima serata di carnevale
 1979 - Improvviso
 1977 - La gabbia
 1976 - Le cinque stagioni
 1975 - L'uomo dei venti
 1975 - Le avventure di Calandrino e Buffalmacco
 1972 - Every Sunday Morning (Tutte Le Domeniche Mattina) - nominated in 1972 Venice International Film Festival 
 1971 - Ciao Gulliver (So Long Gulliver)

References 

Italian film directors
Italian screenwriters
Italian male screenwriters
Living people
Year of birth missing (living people)